Cerro Rosa is the third highest peak of Puerto Rico measuring  above sea level. The mountain is located in the Cordillera Central, on the border between the municipalities of Ciales and Jayuya.

References 

Mountains of the Caribbean
Mountains of Puerto Rico
Ciales, Puerto Rico
Jayuya, Puerto Rico

Geography of Puerto Rico